The Flinders Ranges worm-lizard (Aprasia pseudopulchella) is a species of lizard in the Pygopodidae family endemic to Australia.

References

Pygopodids of Australia
Aprasia
Reptiles described in 1974
Taxonomy articles created by Polbot